is a Japanese baseball-themed one-shot manga by Mitsuru Adachi which was published in the No. 22/23 issue of Weekly Shōnen Sunday on April 27, 2011. In 2014, it was included in the Short Game short story collection.

Story
Over Fence tells the story of Minori Serizawa, the manager of the idiosyncratic Asaoka High School Baseball Club, as she struggles to cure her players of their various bad habits.

Characters

The manager of the Asaoka High School Baseball Club.

Notes

References

2011 manga
Baseball in anime and manga
Mitsuru Adachi
One-shot manga
Shogakukan manga
Shōnen manga